"Go" is a song by British rock band Asia, released as the lead-off single from their third studio album Astra. A 7-inch single with "After the War" as the B-side was issued in the United States and the United Kingdom in November 1985 by Geffen Records. Additionally, remix and instrumental versions made by keyboard player Geoff Downes were issued as a 12-inch single in the United Kingdom.

Like most of the songs from the album, "Go" was written by vocalist/bassist John Wetton and Downes. It features Mandy Meyer's prominent guitar work.

An official music video was produced and, despite it being a big MTV hit, the single only attained a peak of number 46 on the Billboard Hot 100.

Cash Box praised the "airtight arrangement and musicianship" but said that it is "hard driving yet unadventurous."  Billboard called it a "massive and mighty record."

Track listing

Personnel

Asia
 John Wetton – vocals, bass guitars
 Geoff Downes – keyboards; producer
 Mandy Meyer – guitar
 Carl Palmer – drums

Technical personnel
 Mike Stone – producer, engineer, mixing engineer
 Greg Ladanyi – mixing engineer
 Alan Douglas – engineer, mixing engineer
 John David Kalodner – executive producer
 Roger Dean – cover design

Charts

References

Asia (band) songs
1985 songs
1985 singles
Geffen Records singles
Songs written by John Wetton
Songs written by Geoff Downes
Song recordings produced by Mike Stone (record producer)